New Caney High School is a public secondary school in New Caney and is a part of the New Caney Independent School District.   NCHS is currently a 6A school. The school has received recognition for its JROTC program, band, journalism program, DECA program and Academic Decathlon team.

New Caney High School offers Advanced Placement courses, athletics, career and technology courses, dual credit, National Honor Society, and a host of special programs.

History
New Caney ISD became an independent school district in 1938. The high school, named New Caney High School, had a total of nine students in its first graduating class. That original building is still in use as the Ada Lea Casey Special Education Center.

Demographics
In the 2018–2019 school year, there were 1,893 students enrolled at New Caney High School. The ethnic distribution of students was as follows: 
 3.4% African American
 0.4% Asian
 0.3% Native Hawaiian/Pacific Islander
 57.4% Hispanic
 0.2% American Indian
 35.8% White
 2.5% Two or More Races

70.8% of students were eligible for free or reduced-price lunch. The school was eligible for Title I funding.

Academics
For each school year, the Texas Education Agency rates school performance using an A–F grading system based on statistical data. For 2018–2019, the school received a score of 79 out of 100, resulting in a C grade. The school received a score of 68 the previous year.

Two middle schools (grades 6-8) feed into New Caney High School: Pine Valley Middle School and Keefer Crossing Middle School.

Notable alumni
Adam Dunn - Professional baseball player for the Chicago White Sox
Robert Crippen - Former NASA astronaut
Jason "Sundance" Head - Season 11 winner of The Voice

References

External links
 New Caney ISD

New Caney Independent School District high schools
Public education in Houston
1938 establishments in Texas